Svanvik is a village in the municipality of Sør-Varanger in Troms og Finnmark, Norway. The village had a population of 250 in 2019.

Svanvik Church, Pasvik Folk College and Øvre Pasvik National Park are located in Svanvik. Svanvik has its own primary and secondary school, Pasvik School. The school is located approx. 2-3 kilometers from Pasviktunet and it was expanded in 2008.

Svanvik border staton
Svanvik has one of the border guard stations on the Norway–Russia border. From Svanvik, they keep an eye on, among other things, the Russian mining town of Nikel, which is only  from Svanvik (but  by car). Like Skogfoss and Gjøkåsen, Svanvik is located by the Paatsjoki. The station bears the name of the village in which it is located and is part of the community.

References

Villages in Finnmark
Populated places of Arctic Norway